Adam Charles Goldberg (born October 25, 1970) is an American character actor, filmmaker, musician, and photographer. Known for his supporting roles in film and television, Goldberg has appeared in films such as Dazed and Confused, Saving Private Ryan, A Beautiful Mind, and Zodiac. He has also played leading roles in independent films such as The Hebrew Hammer and 2 Days in Paris. His TV appearances include the shows  Law & Order: Criminal Intent,  My Name Is Earl, Friends, Entourage, The Jim Gaffigan Show, The Unusuals, and his role as hitman Mr. Numbers in the first season of Fargo. He currently stars opposite Queen Latifah on CBS' The Equalizer.

Early life
Goldberg was born in Santa Monica, California, the son of Donna Gable, a psychologist, and Earl Goldberg, a former owner of Goldberg and Solovy Foods, a wholesale food business. His father is Jewish, while his mother is a non-practicing Catholic of German, French, Italian, Irish, and a "bit of Mexican" descent.

Career

Film
Goldberg's first major screen role was in the Billy Crystal film Mr. Saturday Night (1992). His second major screen role was as Mike Newhouse in Richard Linklater's film Dazed and Confused (1993). His career-making role was arguably that of the tough, wise-cracking infantryman Mellish in Steven Spielberg's 1998 film Saving Private Ryan. While he played lead characters in The Hebrew Hammer, 2 Days in Paris, and (Untitled), Goldberg is mostly known for his character work in film and television.

Notable roles include Jerry, the undead servant to Christopher Walken's Angel Gabriel in the supernatural thriller The Prophecy; Sol in A Beautiful Mind, opposite Russell Crowe; and Denny in Déjà Vu, opposite Denzel Washington. Goldberg has also voice acted in Babe: Pig in the City, Homeward Bound II, and A Monster in Paris.

Goldberg appeared extensively in the Flaming Lips documentary The Fearless Freaks, and had a supporting role in Christmas on Mars, a science fiction film written and directed by Flaming Lips frontman Wayne Coyne. In 1999, he appeared in the Sixpence None The Richer music video "There She Goes".

Goldberg wrote, produced, directed, and edited the features Scotch and Milk, I Love Your Work, and No Way Jose as well as multiple television projects, notably including the philosophical travelogue Running with the Bulls for IFC.

Music and photography 
A multi-instrumentalist and songwriter, Goldberg composed and arranged the music to the film I Love Your Work with Steven Drozd of The Flaming Lips as well as scoring his most recent feature, No Way Jose, and IFC's Running with the Bulls. He also provided a song for the Hebrew Hammer soundtrack.

Goldberg released his first album, Eros and Omissions, under the LANDy moniker. It was released on June 23, 2009. Flaming Lips drummer Steven Drozd, with whom Goldberg collaborated on the score for I Love Your Work, performed on the record as well as members of the band The Black Pine. Earlimart's Aaron Espinoza is credited as having done the final mix as well as having engineered many of the more recent songs. Goldberg has since changed his musical moniker to The Goldberg Sisters, under which he has made three albums, the last two of which he played every instrument save for strings (provided by his wife Roxanne Daner and musician Merritt Lear) and horns (provided by his engineer and co-producer Andrew Lynch).

On June 7, 2011, Goldberg assembled a live band to perform The Goldberg Sisters single "Shush" on The Late Late Show with Craig Ferguson.

Goldberg is also a photographer, shooting primarily on film and expired Polaroid. His first book was co-published by Hat and Beard Press and contained a limited vinyl version of The Goldberg Sisters' Home: A Nice Place to Visit. Subsequent exhibitions of photography from the book also included live performances of Goldberg Sisters songs by Goldberg and Lynch, utilizing several loop and effects pedals. An early adopter of the now-defunct Vine app, Goldberg was known for incorporating many analog film elements into his six-second "films." He was hired to do forty films for the French company cellular company Orange during the 2013 Cannes Film Festival, during which he made a six-second Vine based on each film entered in competition. He is an avid Instagram user; his account consists of much of his photography while also hosting a cinematic narrative of his family life.

Television 
In 1995, Goldberg appeared in a signature wise-cracking role as delivery boy Leo in the television comedy Double Rush. Goldberg then appeared in a three-episode arc in the second season of Friends (1996) as Chandler's crazy roommate Eddie. He appeared some years later in a nine-episode arc in season two of the Friends spinoff show Joey as Jimmy, Joey Tribbiani's best friend from high school. He also appeared as a main character in the short-lived 2005 Fox series Head Cases.

In 1997, he received an exclusive series development deal with ABC.

Goldberg appeared in the short-lived ensemble cop show The Unusuals, playing a detective in New York City with brain cancer who refuses treatment because of his dislike of doctors. His character was stated as being "sarcastic" and Goldberg had been described as "one of the better reasons to watch." He subsequently appeared in the short-lived ensemble cop show NYC 22.

In 2014 portrayed Mr. Numbers, one half of the hit man team in the first season of FX's Fargo. This was the second time working with creator Noah Hawley who had cast Goldberg in 2009's The Unusuals. He had to learn ASL sign language for the role and began production just a few days after wrapping principal photography on his feature, No Way Jose. While shooting Fargo, Goldberg was also editing his feature and much of it was assembled in his hotel room in Calgary.

Goldberg played the role of Dave Marks, a struggling comedian and Jim Gaffigan's best friend, for two seasons on the TV Land sitcom The Jim Gaffigan Show. He shot the pilot during a week off from production on Fargo.

In 2017, Goldberg joined the cast of NBC's Taken as a regular cast member during the show's second season. He portrayed Kilroy, an accomplished computer hacker.

In 2019, Goldberg had a supporting role in the cast of CBS's God Friended Me as technical entrepreneur, Simon Hayes.

In 2020 Goldberg began production on CBS' The Equalizer, a reboot of the original. He played another hacker, this time opposite Queen Latifah.

Personal life
Goldberg has had three children with his wife, artist and designer Roxanne Daner. Their first child together, Bix, a son, was stillborn. The couple openly talks about the experience. Their next son, Bud, was born shortly after, in November 2014. Goldberg and Daner married on Halloween in 2014. They had another son, Sonny, in September 2018.

Filmography

Film

Television

References

External links

LANDy website

1970 births
20th-century American male actors
21st-century American male actors
American male film actors
American people of French descent
American people of German descent
American people of Irish descent
American male actors of Mexican descent
American male television actors
American male voice actors
Jewish American male actors
Living people
Male actors from Santa Monica, California
Musicians from Santa Monica, California
Sarah Lawrence College alumni
21st-century American Jews